Alessandro Agostini (born 23 July 1979) is an Italian football coach and a former player who played as a left-back. He is the current Under-19 coach of Genoa.

Playing career 
Agostini joined Cagliari in January 2004. He renewed his contract in 2006 (to 2009); in 2008 (to 2011).

Coaching career
He was appointed head coach of the Under-19 squad of Cagliari for the 2020–21 season. In July 2021, he obtained a UEFA A coaching license.

On 2 May 2022, following Walter Mazzarri's dismissal from his role as Cagliari head coach with three games to go, Agostini was appointed caretaker manager in an attempt to overturn the club's fortunes. However, Agostini failed to save Cagliari from relegation, and left the position by the end of the season after the club chose to appoint Fabio Liverani as their new permanent manager. He mutually rescinded his contract with Cagliari shortly thereafter.

On 6 January 2023, Agostini was announced as the new Under-19 youth coach of Genoa, replacing Alberto Gilardino following the appointment of the latter as the new first team head coach.

References

External links 
 Gazzetta dello Sport player profile 
 http://aic.football.it/scheda/641/agostini-alessandro.htm

1979 births
Living people
People from Vinci, Tuscany
Serie A players
Serie B players
Serie C players
Ternana Calcio players
U.S. Pistoiese 1921 players
A.C.N. Siena 1904 players
Cagliari Calcio players
Empoli F.C. players
ACF Fiorentina players
Torino F.C. players
Hellas Verona F.C. players
Association football defenders
Italian footballers
Italian football managers
Cagliari Calcio managers
Sportspeople from the Metropolitan City of Florence
Footballers from Tuscany